Maxim Karlovich Kantor (born 22 December 1957), is a Russian painter, writer, essayist and art historian.

Maxim Kantor's pictures can be seen in the Bundestag in Berlin, Genscher Saal (Library and Storm); the Pontifical Academy of Sciences St. Thomas Aquinas in Rome; Paris Saint Merry Church; Brussels cathedral; Common Room of Pembroke College of Oxford, Hesburgh Library, University Notre Dame, Indiana (USA). He started to be exhibited in Europe since 1986. Held personal shows in museums around the world, among them: Frankfurt Staedel Museum, Schirn Kunsthalle, Moscow State Tretyakov Gallery,  Bochum Museum, London British Museum, Akademie der Kunste, Berlin, Osnabrük Felix Nussbaum Museum, South Australian Gallery, Adelaida,  Luxembourg National Museum, Saint-Petersburg State Russian Museum, Academy of Fine Art in Vienna, National Museum in Gdansk, etc. The detailed lists of Kantor’s exhibitions and of the Museums and Collections with his works are attached. In 1997 he represented Russia on 47 Biennale d’Arte di Venezia with the personal exhibition Criminal Chronicle. He collaborated with number of art galleries (Eva Poll, Berlin; Asbaek, Copenhagen; Nierendorf, Berlin; Wittrock Kunsthandel, Dusseldorf-Berlin; Barry Fridman, New York).

As a writer, he published several novels (Text book of Drawing, Red Light, Hazard), translated into German, French, Italian, Dutch, Polish,  theatre plays (staged in Russia), essay books. The book Thistle and Thorn published in August 2021, is dedicated to the philosophy of art and social history of Europe, and is based on researches  and lecture courses held  in Notre Dame University (IN US), Cambridge and Oxford Universities.

As author of graphic works in tradition of "livre d'artist", he created Die Hermannsschlaht,  The Ballades of Robin Hood,  Faust. He created  etching portfolios (Atlases: Wasteland, Metropolis, Vulcanus) purchased by National Libraries of France, Austria, Luxembourg.

In 2020 - 21 he executed the stained-glass window Saint Jerome and the Lion for the decoration of historical buildings of Moscow City Hospital No. 23 (Davidovsky Hospital).

Since 2021 Maxim Kantor has been holding lectures of history and philosophy of art on the Youtube channel Maxim Kantor. He is a Honorary Fellow of Pembroke College, Oxford. He was offered a honorary degree in philosophy of Turin University. Maxim Kantor lives and works in France (Ile de Ré), Germany (Emden and Berlin) and UK (Oxford).

References

External links 
 
 2018 Who am I without my father - Conversation between Maxim Kantor and Herbert Ohrlinger Dropbox - File Deleted
 Russian Painter Turns to Fiction To Create Panorama of Homeland The Washington Post
 Maxim Kantor and Alexandr Borovsky at the opening of the show "VULCANO" Fondazione Stelline, Milan 25.10.2012-06.01.2013. Video
 Maxim Kantor and Alexandr Borovsky at the opening of the show "Atlantis" Palazzo Zenobio, Venice 1.06-21.09.2013. Video 

21st-century Russian painters
Russian male painters
Russian Jews
Living people
Russian writers
1957 births